Alizarin crimson is a shade of red that is biased slightly more towards purple than towards orange on the color wheel and has a blue undertone.  It is named after the organic dye alizarin, found in the madder plant, and the related synthetic lake pigment alizarin crimson (PR83 in the Color Index). William Henry Perkin had co-discovered a way to synthesize the pigment alizarin, which became known as the color alizarin crimson. Its consistency and lightfastness quickly made it a favourite red pigment for artists.

Alizarin crimson can create a wide range of rich, permanent purples and browns. The dye was prominently used for dyeing clothes and traces were found in Ancient Egypt, Persia and the ruins of Pompeii. By the seventh century BC, the dye had been made into a lake pigment and was used across Europe, the Middle East and Asia. By this time the use of madder dye and pigment were widespread, but they remained costly and time-consuming to produce.

Alizarin crimson was a popular color Bob Ross used on his show The Joy of Painting.

See also 

 Madder
 Alizarin
 Crimson
 Lists of colours
 Shades of red

References 

Shades of red